Eyach may refer to:

 Eyach (Ammer), a river of Bavaria, Germany, tributary of the Ammer
 Eyach (Neckar), a river of Baden-Württemberg, Germany, tributary of the Neckar
 Eyach (Enz), a river of Baden-Württemberg, Germany, tributary of the Enz
 Eyach (Eutingen), a district of the town Eutingen im Gäu, Baden-Württemberg, Germany
 Eyach virus, a viral infection